Nonlinear mixed-effects models are a special case of regression analysis for which a range of different software solutions are available. The statistical properties of nonlinear mixed-effects models make direct estimation by a BLUE estimator impossible. Nonlinear mixed effects models are therefore estimated according to Maximum Likelihood principles. Specific estimation methods are applied, such as linearization methods as first-order (FO), first-order conditional (FOCE) or the laplacian (LAPL), approximation methods such as iterative-two stage (ITS), importance sampling (IMP), stochastic approximation estimation (SAEM) or direct sampling. A special case is use of non-parametric approaches. Furthermore, estimation in limited or full Bayesian frameworks is performed using the Metropolis-Hastings or the NUTS algorithms. Some software solutions focus on a single estimation method, others cover a range of estimation methods and/or with interfaces for specific use cases.

General-purpose software 
General (use case agnostic) nonlinear mixed effects estimation software can be covering multiple estimation methods or focus on a single.

Software with multiple estimation methods 

 SAS is a package that is used in the wide statistical community and supports multiple estimation methods from PROC NLMIX.
 Multiple estimation methods are available in the R open source software system, such as nlme.
 MATLAB provides multiple estimation methods in their nlmefit system.

SPSS at the moment does not support non-linear mixed effects methods.

Software dedicated to a single estimation method 
 WinBUGS is an implementation of the Metropolis-Hastings method for Bayesian analysis.
 Stan is open source software that implements the NUTS algorithm.

Software dedicated to pharmacometrics 
The field of pharmacometrics relies heavily on nonlinear mixed effects approaches and therefore uses specialized software approaches. As with general-purpose software, implementations of both single or multiple estimation methods are available. This type of software relies heavily on ODE solvers.

Software with multiple estimation methods 

 NONMEM is the most widely used software in the field of pharmacometics.
 Phoenix implements multiple estimation methods in a graphical user interface.
 Pumas implements multiple estimation methods in the julia language.
 nlmixr/nlmixr2 is a suite interfaced in R that implements FOCE and SAEM. 
 ADAPT and S-ADAPT implement multiple estimation methods in a graphical or scripting interface, respectively.

Software dedicated to a single estimation method 

 Monolix is a powerful implementation of SAEM which also can parse NMTRAN.
 NPEM implements non-parametric mixed effects.

Related software 

 Efficiency of ODE solvers impacts quality of estimation. Popular solvers are Runge-Kutta based methods, various stiff solvers and switching solvers such as LSODA of the LAPACK suite.
 A specialized form of pharmacokinetics modeling, physiology-based pharmacokinetic (PBPK) modeling can in some cases also be seen as a nonlinear mixed-effects implementation, see also the software section of that lemma.
 Optimal design software such as PopED can be used in conjunction with estimation.

References 

Regression analysis
Numerical software